Switch Lanes or Switch lanes may refer to:

 "Switch Lanes (song)", a song by rapper Tyga from the 2013 album Hotel California
 "Switch Lanes", a single by hip hop artist Ritz from the 2013 album The Life and Times of Jonny Valiant
 Local–express lanes or collector–distributor lanes, an arrangement of carriageways on a major highway to segregate merging and diverging traffic from through traffic. 
 Reversible lanes, or tidal flow lanes, used to allow travel in different directions depending on the circumstances 
 Passing lanes or overtaking lanes, for use by motorists for overtaking

See also
 Contraflow lane, a lane running in the opposite direction to surrounding lanes
Contraflow lane reversal, temporary contraflow lanes for e.g. emergency evacuation or maintenance
 "Laneswitch (song)", single from rapper Lil Tjay's debut album True 2 Myself
 Splitting lanes, riding a bicycle or motorcycle between lanes
 Lane (disambiguation)